Alireza Heidari is an Iranian football goalkeeper who currently plays for Machine Sazi in the Iran Pro League.

Club career

Rah Ahan
Heidari was part of Rah Ahan Academy during 2007 to 2012. He promoted to first team by Mehdi Tartar in 2010. He made his debut in final fixture of 2011–12 Iran Pro League against Shahin Bushehr as a starter.

Padideh
He joined Padideh in summer 2013 with four-years contract. He made his debut for Padideh
against Saba Qom as a substitute for Mojtaba Roshangar in 2014–15 Iran Pro League.

Club career statistics

References

External links
 Alireza Heidari at PersianLeague.com
 Alireza Heidari at IranLeague.ir

Living people
Iranian footballers
Rah Ahan players
Shahr Khodro F.C. players
1992 births
Association football goalkeepers